Joseph Jiquel Lanoe (3 October 1875 – 15 February 1948) was a French actor who appeared in films and theater in the United States. He had roles in more than 100 American Biograph films. A gay man, D. W. Griffith cast him as a gay Eunuch character in Judith of Bethulia.

Filmography

My Hero (1912 film), as Settler
Three Friends (film) (1913), as In First Factory 
Brute Force (1914 film), as In Club (Prologue) / Tribesman (The Old Days) 
Judith of Bethulia (1914), as Eunuch
The Lady and the Mouse, as At Garden Party 
The Mothering Heart, as Outside Club / Club Patron 
A Splendid Hazard
Pirate Gold (1913 film), as The Successful Suitor 
Oil and Water (film), as In Second Audience
Love in an Apartment Hotel, as In Hotel Lobby 
The Old Bookkeeper, as In Office 
Red Hicks Defies the World, as In Crowd Charles Hill Mailes - In Crowd 
The Transformation of Mike, as In Bar / At Dance 
Prodigal Daughters, as Juda Botanya 
The God Within, as In Other Town
The Inner Circle (1912 film), as The Rich Italian 
The Yaqui Cur, as In Tribe 
The Eternal City (1915 film), as Charles Minghelli
The Punishment (1912 film) as The Father 
The Spirit Awakened, as Jacque Lenor
A Sailor's Heart, as On Porch 
The Mothering Heart, as Outside Club / Club Patron 
The Lesser Evil (1912 film), as In Smuggler Band 
The Root of Evil (film), as the Secretary 
A Beast at Bay, as At Station 
Fate's Turning, as Attorney
The Kiss (1921 film) as Carlos
With the Enemy's Help, as The Claim Assessor
Just Like a Woman (1912 film), as the Broker 
The Narrow Road, as A Prisoner / The Foreman  
A Voice from the Deep, as On Beach
Madonna of the Storm (1913), as The Clubman 
An Outcast Among Outcasts, A Factory Manager 
The Sorrowful Shore, as On Shore 
The Burglar's Dilemma, as Birthday Wellwisher
The Mistake (film), as Indian 
Death's Marathon, as Man at Club 
The Hero of Little Italy, as At Ball 
A Dash Through the Clouds (1912), as Townsman 
The Eternal Mother (1912 film),  as A Friend  
Her Awakening (1911), as A Doctor / Accident Witness
For His Son, At Soda Fountain 
The Battle (1911 film), as A Union Officer
Love in an Apartment Hotel, as In Hotel Lobby 
The Unwelcome Guest, as The Doctor 
The Massacre (film) (1912), as In Wagon Train Charles Hill Mailes as In Wagon Train 
A Feud in the Kentucky Hills, as Second Clan Member
Almost a Wild Man, as In Audience 
The Altar Stairs (1922), as Captain Jean Malet 
The Yaqui Cur (1913), as In Tribe
The Forbidden Woman (1920 film) 
The Tiger's Coat (1920)
 The Magnificent Brute (1921)

References

External links

French male film actors
French emigrants to the United States
1875 births
1948 deaths